Langile Abertzale Iraultzaileen Alderdia (LAIA), was a Communist political party of the Southern Basque Country and Basque nationalist ideology that was born during the last years of the Francoist State as a result of a division of ETA. Its acronym, laia is also the Basque name of an agricultural tool.

LAIA participated in the formation of on the Koordinadora Abertzale Sozialista (KAS) and in the Herri Batasuna (HB) coalition, that left in 1980, joining Auzolan in 1983. LAIA disappeared in the mid-1980s. The party never officially registered in the register of political parties of the Interior Ministry, and always participated in elections through coalitions.

References

Leonisio Calvo, Rafael (2012). «Izquierda abertzale, de la heterogeneidad al monolitismo». III Congreso Internacional de Historia de Nuestro Tiempo. Logroño: Universidad de La Rioja. p. 385. .

Defunct communist parties in the Basque Country (autonomous community)
Basque nationalism
Political parties disestablished in 1984
1984 disestablishments in Spain
Anti-Francoism